Jörg Puttlitz (born 25 August 1952 in Hagen) is a German rower.

References 

 
 

1952 births
Living people
Sportspeople from Hagen
Rowers at the 1984 Summer Olympics
Rowers at the 1988 Summer Olympics
Olympic bronze medalists for West Germany
Olympic rowers of West Germany
Olympic medalists in rowing
West German male rowers
World Rowing Championships medalists for West Germany
Medalists at the 1988 Summer Olympics
20th-century German people